300D may refer to:

 Canon EOS 300D, a digital single-lens reflex camera
 Mercedes-Benz 300D, a series of cars beginning with the 300D in 1974  
 Mercedes-Benz 300d or Mercedes-Benz W189, a car produced 1957–1962